Laibson is a surname. Notable people with the surname include:

David Laibson (born 1966), American economist
Michael Laibson, American television producer and theatre director

See also
Lainson